A Title drop, also known as a titular line, is a line of dialogue in a film, television series, book or other media containing the title. It often indicates the scene has a special significance or can be a "penny drop" moment explaining the title.

Sometimes the title drop can happen at the finale, for example in The Breakfast Club where the final line is "Sincerely yours, The Breakfast Club"., or Iron Man where the final line is "I am Iron Man."

Examples 

 Kingdom Of Heaven - “A new world. A better world than has ever been seen. A kingdom of conscience. A kingdom of heaven.”
 Chinatown - “Forget it Jake. It’s Chinatown.”
 Back To The Future Part III - “Hey, Doc! Where you goin' now? Back to the future?”
 Attack on Titan - "The Attack Titan."

References

External links
 Title Drops compilation on Vimeo

Narrative techniques